The following squads were named for the 1955 South American Championship that took place in Chile.

Argentina
 Luis Bagnato
 Roqué Marrapodi
 Julio Musimessi
 Arnaldo Balay
 Juan Colman
 Pedro Dellacha
 Ernesto Gutiérrez
 Guillermo Leguía
 Francisco Lombardo
 Federico Vairo
 Norberto Conde
 Angel Labruna
 Eliseo Mouriño
 Pascasio Sola
 Ricardo Bonelli
 José Borello
 Carlos Cecconato
 Osvaldo Cruz
 Ernesto Cucchiaroni
 Ernesto Grillo
 Rodolfo Micheli
 Santiago Vernazza

Chile
 Misael Escuti
 Manuel Alvarez
 Isaac Carrasco
 Antonio Valjalo
 Rodolfo Almeyda
 Ramiro Cortés
 Sergio Espinoza
 Enrique Hormazábal
 Ted Robledo
 Hernán Rodríguez
 Luis Vera
 Guillermo Eduardo Díaz
 Guillermo Díaz Carmona
 René Meléndez
 Manuel Muñoz
 Jaime Ramírez
 George Robledo

Ecuador
 Carlos Alume
 Marcial Astudillo
 José Vicente Balseca
 Alfredo Bonnard
 Enrique Cantos
 Climaco Cañarte
 Luis Drouet
 Gerónimo Gando
 Rómulo Gómez
 Honorato Gonzabay
 Jorge Izaguirre
 Isidro Matute
 Hugo Mejia
 Colón Merizalde
 Daniel Pinto
 Mario Saeteros
 Carlos Sánchez
 Galo Solís
 Elías Genereldo Triviño
 Ricardo Valencia
 Washington Villacreses
 Orlando Zambrano

Paraguay
 Juan Bautista Agüero
 Alejandro Arce
 Rogelio Bedoya
 Juan Cañete
 Honario Casco
 Eligio Echagüe
 Celso González
 Hermes González
 Joel Jovellanos
 Robustiano Maciel
 Eulogio Martínez
 Melanio Olmedo
 José Parodi
 Ivón Poisson
 Oppe Quiñónez
 Máximo Rolón
 Juan Angel Romero
 Darío Segovia
 Marcelino Vargas
 Salvador Villalba

Peru
 Guillermo Barbadillo
 Andrés Bedoya
 Félix Castillo
 Roberto Castillo
 Germán Colunga
 Guillermo Delgado
 Roberto Drago
 Alberto Garrido
 Óscar Gómez Sánchez
 Cornelio Heredia
 Dagoberto Lavalle
 Carlos Lazón
 Alberto Lloret de Mola
 Máximo Mosquera
 Luis Navarrete
 Agapito Perales
 Víctor Salas
 Luis Suárez
 Alberto Terry

Uruguay
 Roque Máspoli
 Walter Taibo
 Nestor Carballo
 Matías González
 Waldemar González
 William Martínez
 Caledonio Rey
 Víctor Rodríguez Andrade
 Omar Tejera
 Carlos Carranza
 Luis Cruz
 Héctor Demarco
 Roberto Leopardi
 Julio Abbadie
 Omar Abreo
 Carlos Borges
 Alberto Chagas
 Guillermo Escalada
 Américo Galván
 Oscar Míguez
 Walter Morel
 Julio Perez

References

Squads
Copa América squads